Nicholas Burns (born 1977) is an English actor, best known for his comic performance as the title character in Nathan Barley. He played Martin Weedon in Benidorm and Alex in No Heroics, as well as making appearances alongside various Nathan Barley co-stars in The Mighty Boosh and The IT Crowd.

Early life
Burns was born in Derbyshire, and educated at Repton School. He trained at LAMDA.

Career
Beyond Nathan Barley Burns has had recurring roles in the TV series Absolute Power, Roman's Empire and the sketch show Man Stroke Woman.  Burns also made an appearance in The Mighty Boosh as the ruler of the planet Xooberon; in The IT Crowd as Jerome, the director of a musical called Gay!; and in episode "At Bertram's Hotel" of Marple as Jack and Joel Britten. He turned up as an Aussie tennis coach in The McClintock Factor, a mockumentary chronicling the rise and fall of the former media tycoon and internet blogger Jeremy McClintock.

Burns featured in the first three series of the ITV comedy Benidorm, playing Martin Weedon, and in the superhero sitcom No Heroics, playing The Hotness.

Burns’ stage credits include Much Ado About Nothing at the Sheffield Crucible Theatre, the satire The Madness of George Dubya and Ghost Stories, both of which transferred to London's West End, Penelope Skinner's The Village Bike at the Royal Court, The Recruiting Officer at the Donmar Warehouse and Pinero's The Magistrate at the Royal National Theatre, a production included in Season 4 of National Theatre Live.

In April 2013 it was announced that Burns would be returning to Benidorm as Martin Weedon for series 6 of the show in 2014.

In 2020, Burns appeared in series four of Strike and in Small Axe.

Filmography

Television

Film

References

External links
Nicholas Burns at the Internet Movie Database

English male television actors
Alumni of the London Academy of Music and Dramatic Art
People educated at Repton School
1977 births
Living people
Place of birth missing (living people)